The 1992–93 Illinois Fighting Illini men's basketball team represented the University of Illinois.

Regular season
After sitting out a season, Andy Kaufmann returned for the 1992-93 campaign and helped lead Illinois to a 19-13 record and trip to the
NCAA tournament.

Roster

Source

Schedule
																																																
Source																																																																																																

|-
!colspan=12 style="background:#DF4E38; color:white;"| Non-Conference regular season																																															
	
	
	
	
	
	
	
	
	
	
	
|-
!colspan=9 style="background:#DF4E38; color:#FFFFFF;"|Big Ten regular season
	
	
	
	
	
	
	
	
	
	
	
	
	
	
	
	
	
	
	
|-
!colspan=9 style="text-align: center; background:#DF4E38"|NCAA tournament

Season Statistics

Awards and honors
 Deon Thomas
Fighting Illini All-Century team (2005)
Team Most Valuable Player 
Lou Henson
Big Ten Coach of the Year.

Team players drafted into the NBA

Rankings

References

Illinois Fighting Illini
Illinois Fighting Illini men's basketball seasons
1992 in sports in Illinois
1993 in sports in Illinois
Illinois